Oberonia is a large genus of flowering plants in the orchid family, Orchidaceae.
The following is a list of Oberonia species accepted by the World Checklist of Selected Plant Families as at January 2019. Includes (20 +) added species accepted by Plants of the World Online.

 Oberonia acarus Evrard ex Gagnep.
 Oberonia acaulis Griff.
 Oberonia acaulis var. acaulis
 Oberonia acaulis var. luchunensis S.C.Chen
 Oberonia affinis Ames & C.Schweinf.
 Oberonia agamensis J.J.Sm.
 Oberonia agastyamalayana C.S.Kumar
 Oberonia alopecurus Schltr.
 Oberonia anamalayana J.Joseph
 Oberonia anguina Schltr.
 Oberonia angustifolia Lindl.
 Oberonia anthropophora Lindl.
 Oberonia aporophylla Rchb.f.
 Oberonia arcuata Schltr.
 Oberonia arisanensis Hayata
 Oberonia arunachalensis A.N.Rao
 Oberonia asperula J.J.Sm.
 Oberonia attenuata Dockrill – Mossman fairy orchid (Australia)
 Oberonia aurea Schltr.
 Oberonia aureolabris 
 Oberonia austroyunnanensis S.C.Chen & Z.H.Tsi
 Oberonia balakrishnanii R.Ansari
 Oberonia bantaengensis J.J.Sm.
 Oberonia basilanensis Ames
 Oberonia batuensis J.J.Sm.
 Oberonia beccarii Finet
 Oberonia bellii Blatt. & McCann
 Oberonia benguetensis Ames
 Oberonia bertoldii King & Pantl.
 Oberonia bicornis Lindl.
 Oberonia bifida Schltr.
 Oberonia bifida var. bifida
 Oberonia bifida var. brachyloba  Schltr.
 Oberonia bilobata Schltr.
 Oberonia boerlageana J.J.Sm.
 Oberonia bopannae Chowlu & Kumar
 Oberonia borneensis Schltr.
 Oberonia bougainvilleana Ormerod
 Oberonia brachyphylla Blatt. & McCann
 Oberonia brachystachys Lindl.
 Oberonia brevispica Schltr.
 Oberonia brunnea Schltr.
 Oberonia brunoniana Wight
 Oberonia calcarea 
 Oberonia caprina Gilli
 Oberonia cardiochila Schltr
 Oberonia carnosa Lavarack – rockpile fairy orchid (Australia)
 Oberonia cathayana Chun & Tang
 Oberonia caulescens Lindl.
 Oberonia cavaleriei Finet
 Oberonia celebica Schltr.
 Oberonia chandrasekharanii V.J.Nair, V.S.Ramach. & R.Ansari
 Oberonia chenii Ormerod
 Oberonia ciliolata Hook.f.
 Oberonia cirrhifera J.J.Sm.
 Oberonia clarkei Hook.f.
 Oberonia claviloba Jayaw.
 Oberonia cleistogama Schltr.
 Oberonia complanata (A.Cunn.) M.A.Clem. & D.L.Jones – southern green fairy orchid (Australia)
 Oberonia cordata Schltr.
 Oberonia costeriana J.J.Sm.
 Oberonia crassilabris Schltr.
 Oberonia crateriformis D.L.Jones & M.A.Clem. – cratered fairy orchid (Australia)
 Oberonia cryptantha Schltr.
 Oberonia cuneata J.J.Sm.
 Oberonia cylindrica Lindl.
 Oberonia delacourii Gagnep.
 Oberonia delicata Z.H.Tsi & S.C.Chen
 Oberonia dimorphophylla J.J.Sm.
 Oberonia dissitiflora Ridl.
 Oberonia disticha (Lam.) Schltr.
 Oberonia diura Schltr.
 Oberonia djamuensis Schltr.
 Oberonia djongkongensis J.J.Sm.
 Oberonia dolabrata Jayaw.
 Oberonia dolichocaulis Seidenf.
 Oberonia dolichophylla Schltr.
 Oberonia dolichostachys Aver.
 Oberonia drepanophylla Schltr.
 Oberonia dubia J.J.Sm.
 Oberonia elbertii J.J.Sm.
 Oberonia elegans Schltr.
 Oberonia elmeri Ames
 Oberonia elongata Ridl.
 Oberonia emarginata King & Pantl.
 Oberonia enoensis J.J.Sm.
 Oberonia ensifolia J.B.Comber
 Oberonia ensiformis (Sm.) Lindl.
 Oberonia equitans (G.Forst.) Mutel
 Oberonia evrardii Gagnep.
 Oberonia exaltata Schltr.
 Oberonia falcata King & Pantl.
 Oberonia falcifolia Schltr.
 Oberonia falconeri Hook.f.
 Oberonia fallax J.J.Sm.
 Oberonia ferruginea C.S.P.Parish ex Hook.f.
 Oberonia filaris Ridl.
 Oberonia finisterrae Schltr.
 Oberonia fissiglossa N.Hallé
 Oberonia fissipetala Mansf.
 Oberonia flavescens D.L.Jones & M.A.Clem. – northern green fairy orchid (Australia)
 Oberonia forcipata Lindl.
 Oberonia forcipifera Schltr.
 Oberonia formosana Hayata
 Oberonia fornicata Jayaw.
 Oberonia fungumolens Burkill
 Oberonia gammiei King & Pantl.
 Oberonia gigantea Fukuy.
 Oberonia glandulifera Ridl.
 Oberonia gongshanensis Ormerod
 Oberonia govidjoae Schltr.
 Oberonia gracilipes Schltr.
 Oberonia gracilis Hook.f.
 Oberonia gracillima Ridl.
 Oberonia grandis Ridl.
 Oberonia griffithiana Lindl.
 Oberonia hastata Schltr.
 Oberonia helferi Hook.f.
 Oberonia heliophila Rchb.f.
 Oberonia hexaptera F.Muell.
 Oberonia hispidula Ames
 Oberonia hosei Rendle
 Oberonia hosokawae Fukuy.
 Oberonia hosseusii 
 Oberonia huensis Aver.
 Oberonia × hybrida Schltr.
 Oberonia imbricata (Blume) Lindl.
 Oberonia insectifera Hook.f.
 Oberonia insularis Hayata
 Oberonia integrilabris 
 Oberonia intermedia King & Pantl.
 Oberonia inversiflora J.J.Sm.
 Oberonia irrorata Schltr.
 Oberonia janae Aver.
 Oberonia japenensis J.J.Sm.
 Oberonia japonica (Maxim.) Makino
 Oberonia jenkinsiana Griff. ex Lindl.
 Oberonia jhae 
 Oberonia josephi C.J.Saldanha
 Oberonia kaernbachiana Kraenzl.
 Oberonia kamlangensis A.N.Rao
 Oberonia kanburiensis Seidenf.
 Oberonia kaniensis Schltr.
 Oberonia katakiana A.N.Rao
 Oberonia kempfii Schltr.
 Oberonia kempteri Schltr.
 Oberonia kinabaluensis Ames & C.Schweinf.
 Oberonia kingii Lucksom
 Oberonia klossii Ridl.
 Oberonia kwangsiensis Seidenf.
 Oberonia labidoglossa Schltr.
 Oberonia laeta J.J.Sm.
 Oberonia lancipetala Schltr.
 Oberonia langbianensis Gagnep.
 Oberonia latifii J.J.Sm.
 Oberonia latilabris Schltr.
 Oberonia latipetala L.O.Williams
 Oberonia laxa Schltr.
 Oberonia ledermannii Schltr.
 Oberonia leytensis Ames
 Oberonia linearifolia Ames
 Oberonia linearis Schltr.
 Oberonia linearis var. brevipetala  J.J.Sm.
 Oberonia linearis var. linearis
 Oberonia linguae T.P.Lin & Y.N.Chang
 Oberonia lipensis Ames
 Oberonia lobbiana Lindl.
 Oberonia lobulata King & Pantl.
 Oberonia longhutensis J.J.Sm.
 Oberonia longibracteata Lindl.
 Oberonia longicaulis Schltr.
 Oberonia longifolia Ridl.
 Oberonia longilabris King & Pantl.
 Oberonia longirachis Seidenf. & H.A.Peders.
 Oberonia longirepens J.J.Wood
 Oberonia longispica Schltr.
 Oberonia longitepala J.J.Wood
 Oberonia lotsyana J.J.Sm.
 Oberonia lucida J.J.Sm.
 Oberonia lunata (Blume) Lindl.
 Oberonia luzonensis Ames
 Oberonia lycopodioides (J.Koenig) Ormerod
 Oberonia maboroensis Schltr.
 Oberonia macrostachys Ridl.
 Oberonia mahawoensis Schltr.
 Oberonia manipurensis Chowlu, Y.N.Devi, A.N.Rao, N.Angela, H.B.Sharma & Akimpou
 Oberonia mannii Hook.f.
 Oberonia marginata Ridl.
 Oberonia marina J.B.Comber
 Oberonia masarangica Schltr.
 Oberonia maxima C.S.P.Parish ex Hook.f.
 Oberonia mcgregorii Ames
 Oberonia meegaskumburae Priyad., Wijew. & Kumar
 Oberonia melinantha Schltr.
 Oberonia menghaiensis S.C.Chen
 Oberonia menglaensis S.C.Chen & Z.H.Tsi
 Oberonia merapiensis Schltr.
 Oberonia merrillii Ames
 Oberonia microphylla (Blume) Lindl.
 Oberonia microtatantha Schltr.
 Oberonia mindorensis Ames
 Oberonia miniata Lindl.
 Oberonia minima Ames
 Oberonia minutissima Ames
 Oberonia monstruosa (Blume) Lindl.
 Oberonia monstruosa var. monstruosa
Oberonia monstruosa var. seramica  J.J.Sm.
 Oberonia mucronata (D.Don) Ormerod
 Oberonia multidentata Aver.
 Oberonia multiflora Ridl.
 Oberonia muriculata Schltr.
 Oberonia murkelensis J.J.Sm.
 Oberonia muthikulamensis 
 Oberonia nayarii R.Ansari & N.P.Balakr.
 Oberonia neglecta Schltr.
 Oberonia nepalensis L.R.Shakya & R.P.Chaudhary
 Oberonia nephroglossa Schltr.
 Oberonia ngoclinhensis Aver.
 Oberonia nitida Seidenf.
 Oberonia obcordata Lindl.
 Oberonia obesa Ames
 Oberonia oblonga R.S.Rogers
 Oberonia odoardi Schltr.
 Oberonia odontopetala Schltr.
 Oberonia oligotricha Schltr.
 Oberonia orbicularis Hook.f.
 Oberonia ovalis Schltr.
 Oberonia oxystophyllum J.J.Sm.
 Oberonia pachyambon Schltr.
 Oberonia pachyphylla King & Pantl.
 Oberonia pachyrachis Rchb.f. ex Hook.f.
 Oberonia pachystachya Lindl.
 Oberonia padangensis Schltr.
 Oberonia palawensis Schltr.
 Oberonia pallideflava Schltr.
 Oberonia papillosa Schltr.
 Oberonia patentifolia Ames & C.Schweinf.
 Oberonia pauzii P.T.Ong & P.O'Byrne
 Oberonia pectinata Schltr.
 Oberonia pedicellata J.J.Sm.
 Oberonia phleoides Schltr.
 Oberonia platycaulon Wight
 Oberonia platychila Schltr.
 Oberonia pleistophylla Schltr.
 Oberonia plumea J.J.Sm.
 Oberonia podostachys Schltr.
 Oberonia ponapensis Tuyama
 Oberonia potamophila Schltr.
 Oberonia prainiana King & Pantl.
 Oberonia proudlockii King & Pantl.
 Oberonia pumilio Rchb.f.
 Oberonia punamensis Schltr.
 Oberonia punctata J.J.Sm.
 Oberonia pygmaea Bunpha, H.A.Pedersen & Sridith
 Oberonia pyrulifera  Lindl.
 Oberonia quadrata Schltr.
 Oberonia quadridentata Aver.
 Oberonia quadrilatera Jayaw.
 Oberonia radicans Schltr.
 Oberonia raoi L.R.Shakya & R.P.Chaudhary
 Oberonia rasmussenii Seidenf.
 Oberonia recurva Lindl.
 Oberonia reilloi Ames
 Oberonia repens Schltr.
 Oberonia reversidens J.J.Sm.
 Oberonia rhizoides Aver.
 Oberonia rhizomatosa J.J.Sm.
 Oberonia rhizophoreti Schltr.
 Oberonia rhodostachys Schltr.
 Oberonia rimachila D.L.Jones & M.A.Clem. – channelled fairy orchid (Australia)
 Oberonia ritaii King & Pantl.
 Oberonia rivularis Schltr.
 Oberonia rotunda Hosok.
 Oberonia ruberrima Schltr.
 Oberonia rubra Ridl.
 Oberonia rufilabris Lindl.
 Oberonia salakana J.J.Sm.
 Oberonia santapaui Kapadia
 Oberonia sarawakensis Schltr.
 Oberonia sarcophylla Schltr.
 Oberonia scapigera Schltr.
 Oberonia scyllae Lindl.
 Oberonia scytophylla Schltr.
 Oberonia sebastiana B.V.Shetty & Vivek.
 Oberonia segawae T.C.Hsu & S.W.Chung
 Oberonia seidenfadeniana J.Joseph & Vajr.
 Oberonia seidenfadenii (H.J.Su) Ormerod
 Oberonia semifimbriata J.J.Sm.
 Oberonia seranica J.J.Sm.
 Oberonia serpentinicaulis J.J.Sm.
 Oberonia serrulata Schltr.
 Oberonia setigera Ames
 Oberonia similis (Blume) Lindl.
 Oberonia simplex Aver.
 Oberonia singalangensis Schltr.
 Oberonia sinuosa Ridl.
 Oberonia sonlaensis Aver.
 Oberonia spathipetala J.J.Sm.
 Oberonia stenophylla Ridl.
 Oberonia subanajamensis J.J.Sm.
 Oberonia subligaculifera J.J.Sm.
 Oberonia suborbicularis Carr
 Oberonia sulcata J.Joseph & Sud.Chowdhury
 Oberonia sumatrensis Ridl.
 Oberonia surigaensis Ames
 Oberonia swaminathanii Ratheesh, Manudev & Sujanapal
 Oberonia tahitensis Lindl.
 Oberonia tatianae Aver.
 Oberonia tenuis Lindl.
 Oberonia teres Kerr
 Oberonia thisbe Rchb.f.
 Oberonia thomsenii J.J.Sm.
 Oberonia thwaitesii Hook.f.
 Oberonia titania Lindl.
 Oberonia tixieri Guillaumin
 Oberonia tjisokanensis J.J.Sm.
 Oberonia tomohonensis Schltr.
 Oberonia toppingii Ames
 Oberonia torana J.J.Sm.
 Oberonia torricellensis Schltr.
 Oberonia transversiloba Holttum
 Oberonia triangularis Ames & C.Schweinf.
 Oberonia trichophora Aver.
 Oberonia trigonoglossa Schltr.
 Oberonia trochopetala Gagnep.
 Oberonia truncata Lindl.
 Oberonia truncatiglossa P.Royen
 Oberonia urostachya Schltr.
 Oberonia valetoniana J.J.Sm.
 Oberonia variabilis Kerr
 Oberonia verticillata Wight
 Oberonia vieillardii (Rchb.f.) M.A.Clem. & D.L.Jones
 Oberonia volucris Schltr.
 Oberonia vulcanica Schltr.
 Oberonia wallichii Hook.f.
 Oberonia wallie-silvae Jayaw.
 Oberonia wappeana J.J.Sm.
 Oberonia wariana Schltr.
 Oberonia watuwilensis J.J.Sm.
 Oberonia wenzelii Ames
 Oberonia weragamaensis Jayaw.
 Oberonia werneri Schltr.
 Oberonia wightiana Lindl.
 Oberonia wynadensis Sivad. & R.T.Balakr.
 Oberonia zeylanica Hook.f.
 Oberonia zimmermanniana J.J.Sm.

References

L
Oberonia